Barthle is a surname. Notable people with the surname include:

Hans Barthle, German World War II soldier
Norbert Barthle (born 1952), German politician